Erik Panizzi (born 15 February 1994) is an Italian footballer who plays as a defender for  club Mantova.

Club career

Reggiana
Born in Guastalla, in the Province of Reggio Emilia, Panizzi started his career at Reggio Emilia for A.C. Reggiana 1919. Panizzi made his debut during 2011–12 Lega Pro Prima Divisione season. Panizzi signed a 3-year contract in January 2013.

SPAL
On 26 August 2013 Panizzi was sold to L.P. 2nd Division club SPAL in a co-ownership deal. On 9 January 2014 Nicolas Giani moved to SPAL, with Panizzi moved to L.P. Prime Division club Vicenza in a temporary deal. On 20 June 2014 Reggiana bought back Panizzi.

Pro Patria
On 31 July 2014 Panizzi was sold to fellow Lega Pro club Pro Patria in a definitive deal. However, on 2 February Reggiana bought back Panizzi, who remained in Busto Arsizio for Pro Patria for the rest of the 2014–15 Lega Pro season.

Siena
On 30 August 2019, he joined Siena on a one-year contract.

Mantova
On 14 August 2020 he moved to Mantova.

International career

Representative teams
Panizzi was a member of Italy Lega Pro representative teams for the 2012–13 Under 20 Regional Competition (appearing twice against Slovenia) and in the 2013–15 International Challenge Trophy (against Ukraine). Panizzi also played in the representative team's match against Oman in February 2013.

References

External links
 
 

1994 births
Living people
People from Guastalla
Footballers from Emilia-Romagna
Italian footballers
Association football defenders
Serie C players
Serie D players
A.C. Reggiana 1919 players
S.P.A.L. players
L.R. Vicenza players
Aurora Pro Patria 1919 players
U.S. Alessandria Calcio 1912 players
A.C.N. Siena 1904 players
Mantova 1911 players
Sportspeople from the Province of Reggio Emilia